Operation Coffee Cup was a campaign conducted by the American Medical Association (AMA) during the late 1950s and early 1960s in opposition to the Democrats' plans to extend Social Security to include health insurance for the elderly, later known as Medicare. As part of the plan, doctors' wives would organize coffee meetings in an attempt to convince acquaintances to write letters to Congress opposing the program. The operation received support from Ronald Reagan, who in 1961 produced the LP record Ronald Reagan Speaks Out Against Socialized Medicine for the AMA, outlining arguments against what he called socialized medicine. This record would be played at the coffee meetings.

Background

The AMA had long opposed any government-run or subsidized provision of health care. Dr. Morris Fishbein, the AMA's president, described the organization's attitude as early as 1939:

... all forms of security, compulsory security, even against old age and unemployment, represent a beginning invasion by the state into the personal life of the individual, represent a taking away of individual responsibility, a weakening of national caliber, a definite step toward either communism or totalitarianism.

As John F. Kennedy took the presidency, one of his priorities was reform of the American health care system. To that end he sent a health care bill to Congress, HR 4222, known as the King-Anderson legislation after its sponsors (Senator Anderson and Rep. Cecil King, of California). The bill provisioned a significant expansion of the government's role in caring for the elderly, including features of what would eventually become Medicare.

References 
 Max J. Skidmore: Social Security and Its Enemies, Westview Press, 1999

American Medical Association
Healthcare reform in the United States
Ronald Reagan
Medicare and Medicaid (United States)